The 1988 Rice Owls football team represented Rice University in the 1988 NCAA Division I-A football season. The team compiled a 0–11 record.

Schedule

References

Rice
Rice Owls football seasons
College football winless seasons
Rice Owls football
Rice Owls football